Andorra competed at the 2013 Mediterranean Games in Mersin, Turkey from the 20 to 30 June 2013.

Andorra was represented by fourteen athletes in eight sports.

Athletics 

Andorra was represented by three athletes.

Men
Track & road events

Bocce 

Andorra was represented by a men's pétanque doubles team.

Pétanque

Cycling 

Andorra was represented by one male cyclist.

Gymnastics

Rhythmic

Judo 

Andorra was represented by two athletes.

Karate 

Andorra was represented by two athletes.

Swimming 

Andorra was represented by one swimmer in four events.

Women

Taekwondo 

Andorra was represented by two athletes.

References

Nations at the 2013 Mediterranean Games
2013
Mediterranean Games